Linval is a given name for males. People named Linval include:

 Prince Jazzbo, born Linval Roy Carter, Jamaican reggae and dancehall DJ and producer
 Linval Dixon, Jamaican footballer
 Linval Joseph, American football defensive tackle
 Linval Laird, retired Jamaican athlete who specialised in the 400 metres
 Linval Thompson, Jamaican reggae and dub musician and record producer

African masculine given names